Hamilton Park may refer to:

United Kingdom 
Hamilton Park Racecourse, Scotland, a horse racing venue

United States 
Hamilton Park (New Haven), Connecticut, a former sports venue
Hamilton Park (Waterbury, Connecticut), a public park
Hamilton Park (Chicago), Illinois, a public park
Hamilton Park, Jersey City, New Jersey, a neighborhood
Hamilton Park, a public park in Weehawken, New Jersey
Hamilton Park, Staten Island, New York, a neighborhood
Hamilton Park, Dallas, Texas, a neighborhood

New Zealand
Hamilton Park cemetery and statistical area, Newstead, Waikato

See also
Hamilton Park Historic District (disambiguation)